Pultenaea stipularis, commonly known as handsome bush-pea, is a species of flowering plant in the family Fabaceae and is endemic to New South Wales. It is an erect shrub with glabrous stems, linear to narrow elliptic leaves, and yellow to orange flowers, sometimes with red markings.

Description

Taxonomy
Pultenaea stipularis was first formally described in 1794 by James Edward Smith in A Specimen of the Botany of New Holland.

Distribution and habitat
Handsome bush-pea grows in forest and tall heathland between Gosford on the Central Coast and Jervis Bay on the South Coast of New South Wales.

References

stipularis
Fabales of Australia
Flora of New South Wales
Taxa named by James Edward Smith